Lykissa is a small village on the mountain of Mount Lykodimo in Messenia, Greece. The settlement was founded during the Greek revolution by Ioannis Pantazopoulos. It is part of the municipal unit Petalidi, which is part of the municipality Messini.

References 

Populated places in Messenia